Jakrenovo is a village in the municipality of Kruševo, North Macedonia.

Demographics
Jakrenovo has traditionally and exclusively been populated by Muslim Albanians.

In statistics gathered by Vasil Kanchov in 1900, the village of Jakrenovo was inhabited by 30 Christian Bulgarians and 100 Muslim Albanians. 

According to the 2021 census, the village had a total of 276 inhabitants. Ethnic groups in the village include:

Albanians 146
Turks 48
Bosniaks 54
Others 28

References

External links

Villages in Kruševo Municipality
Albanian communities in North Macedonia